Radovanu is a commune in Călărași County, Muntenia, Romania. It is composed of two villages, Radovanu and Valea Popii.

As of 2007 the population of Radovanu is 4,695.

References

Communes in Călărași County
Localities in Muntenia